The 1973–74 season was the 94th season of competitive football in England.
It is considered as the end of Leeds United dominance and the start of Liverpool's.

Honours

Notes = Number in parentheses is the times that club has won that honour. * indicates new record for competition

Football League

First Division
Don Revie marked his last season as Leeds United's manager by guiding them to the league championship, before taking over from Sir Alf Ramsey as the England national team manager, with England having failed to qualify for the 1974 World Cup. Revie's Leeds side beat Liverpool to the title by five points to win it for the second time in their history. Despite the sensational dismissal of manager Brian Clough only 18 months after he won the First Division with the club, Derby County regrouped well under new manager Dave Mackay to finish third and qualify for the UEFA Cup, along with Ipswich Town and Stoke City. Newly promoted Burnley finished in sixth place.

Manchester United were relegated from the First Division just six years after winning the European Cup at the end of a season which had seen goalkeeper Alex Stepney as joint top scorer with two goals at Christmas. Manchester United's 36-year stay at the top ended after their penultimate game of the season, a 1–0 home defeat against Manchester City; former Manchester United striker Denis Law scored Manchester City's winning goal. Despite this, the board kept faith in manager Tommy Docherty as the man to regain the club's top flight place.

Joining Manchester United in the Second Division were Norwich City and Southampton. This was the first season in which the League introduced three relegation places from the top division.

Second Division
Former Leeds United player Jack Charlton had managed Middlesbrough to the Second Division title and a place in the First Division. Second in the table were Luton Town, who finished 15 points behind the champions. Third-placed Carlisle United, managed by Alan Ashman, gained a place in the First Division for the first, and so far only, time in their history, completing a rapid rise from the Fourth Division to the First Division. Preston North End and Swindon Town were relegated along with Crystal Palace, who suffered a second successive relegation.

Third Division
Promotion was secured by champions Oldham Athletic, Bristol Rovers and York City, which at the time represented York's highest ever League finish. Cambridge United, Shrewsbury Town, Southport and Rochdale were all relegated.

Fourth Division
Peterborough United won Division Four and were promoted along with Gillingham, Colchester United and Bury. The league's re-election system voted in favour of the bottom four league clubs and there were no departures from or arrivals into the league in 1974.

Top goalscorers

First Division
Mick Channon (Southampton) – 21 goals

Second Division
Duncan McKenzie (Nottingham Forest) – 26 goals

Third Division
Billy Jennings (Watford) – 26 goals

Fourth Division
Brian Yeo (Gillingham) – 31 goals

FA Cup
The FA Cup Final was won by Liverpool, who beat Newcastle United 3–0 with two goals from Kevin Keegan and one from Steve Heighway. Burnley beat Leicester City 1–0 at Filbert Street in the fifth and final third-place playoff, held five days after the final.

Surprises in the earlier rounds included a first round defeat for Exeter City by Alvechurch F.C. and a 4–0 second round replay win for a Walton & Hersham team that included Dave Bassett over a Brighton & Hove Albion side managed by Brian Clough.

League Cup
Bill McGarry's Wolverhampton Wanderers beat Manchester City 2–1 in the final at Wembley Stadium with Kenny Hibbitt and John Richards getting the Wolves goals and Colin Bell replying for City. It was a first-ever League Cup win for Wolves, and their first major trophy since the Stan Cullis era more than a decade earlier.

Plymouth Argyle of the Third Division reached the semi-finals before losing to Manchester City.

European football
Tottenham Hotspur reached the UEFA Cup Final but lost 4–2 on aggregate to Feyenoord. Tottenham Hotspur supporters rioted after the second leg in Rotterdam, following Feyenoord's victory.

Player awards
Veteran Liverpool winger Ian Callaghan won the FWA Footballer of the Year award for his contribution to his club's successful season.
This season also saw the inauguration of two new awards by the Professional Footballers' Association, both of which were voted for by footballers. The PFA Players' Player of the Year award was won by Norman Hunter of Leeds United, whilst the PFA Young Player of the Year award was won by Kevin Beattie of Ipswich Town.

Diary of the season

25 August 1973: Champions Liverpool begin the new league season with a 1–0 win at home to Stoke City.

26 September 1973: England defeat Austria 7–0 at Wembley in their first international of the season, with Mick Channon, Allan Clarke and Tony Currie each scoring twice.

30 September 1973: Leeds United top the First Division at the end of September, leading Coventry City by three points having dropped one point from their first nine matches. At the bottom, Birmingham City and West Ham United are still looking for their first league wins of the season.

15 October 1973: Brian Clough, the Derby County manager, and his assistant Peter Taylor, leave the club after a dispute with the club's directors.

17 October 1973: England fail to qualify for next summer's World Cup after Poland hold them to a 1–1 draw at Wembley in the last qualifying game, sending the Eastern European nation through at the expense of the 1966 world champions.

20 October 1973: Leeds United beat Liverpool 1–0 at Elland Road to move eight points ahead of the reigning champions.

23 October 1973: The eight-day saga of Brian Clough and Derby County, which has seen numerous protests by the club's fans calling for his reinstatement, ends when former Rams player Dave Mackay resigns as Nottingham Forest manager to take charge of his old club.

31 October 1973: Leeds United are five points ahead of Everton, newly promoted Burnley and Derby County at the end of October.

1 November 1973: Brian Clough and his assistant Peter Taylor return to the game after accepting an offer to take charge of Third Division club Brighton & Hove Albion.

30 November 1973: Leeds United, without a league title since 1969, are seven points clear at the top, and still unbeaten, at the end of November. Newcastle United, Burnley, Everton and Liverpool lead the chasing pack. Birmingham City and West Ham United remain at the foot of the table, and have been joined in the relegation zone by Norwich City.

31 December 1973: At the end of the year, Leeds United are still unbeaten in the league, and now lead nearest rivals Liverpool by eight points. Only goal difference keeps Manchester United, level on points with Birmingham City, out of the relegation zone.

31 January 1974: Leeds United remain eight points ahead of Liverpool at the end of January. An improved run of form has seen West Ham United move out of the bottom three at the expense of Manchester United.

2 February 1974: Ipswich Town thrash Southampton 7–0 at Portman Road in the biggest win of the First Division season.

23 February 1974: After beginning the season with a 29-match unbeaten run, Leeds United finally suffer defeat when they are beaten 3–2 by Stoke City at the Victoria Ground. However, they remain eight points ahead of Liverpool, who have moved six points ahead of third-placed Derby County.

8 March 1974: A bad-tempered FA Cup quarter-final tie between Newcastle United and Nottingham Forest is halted mid-match when "hundreds of fans" invade the City Ground pitch, one of whom attacked Forest midfielder Dave Serella.

16 March 1974: Liverpool beat Leeds United 1–0 at Anfield to move six points behind the Yorkshire side with two games in hand. At the other end of the table, Manchester United's relegation problems continue as they lose 1–0 to Birmingham City, who also remain in the bottom three.

30 March 1974: Leeds United lose 3–1 at West Ham United, their third league defeat in a row, handing control of the title race to Liverpool, who are now four points behind with three games in hand.

8 April 1974: Liverpool's hopes of retaining their league title are hit by a 1–0 defeat away to Sheffield United.

20 April 1974: Liverpool draw 0–0 at home to Everton, allowing Leeds United to move to the verge of the title with a 3–2 win over Ipswich Town. Norwich City are relegated to the Second Division.

22 April 1974: In response to the events in Nottingham in March, Newcastle are banned by the Football Association from hosting home cup games during next season.

24 April 1974: Liverpool's 1–0 home defeat by Arsenal ends their double hopes and hands the league title to Leeds United.

27 April 1974: Manchester United go into the Manchester derby at Old Trafford needing to beat neighbours City to stand any chance of avoiding relegation, six years after winning the European Cup. They lose 1–0 with former club hero Denis Law scoring City's only goal, but would have been relegated even if they had won due to Birmingham City winning. Birmingham's win also relegates Southampton, despite the Saints' 3–0 win away to Everton. Leeds United end the season with a 1–0 away win over Queens Park Rangers.

30 April 1974: Sir Alf Ramsey is sacked after 11 years as England manager.

4 May 1974: Liverpool beat Newcastle United 3–0 in the FA Cup final at Wembley, with Kevin Keegan scored twice and Steve Heighway once.

11 May 1974: England's first match since the dismissal of Alf Ramsey ends in a 2–0 win over Wales in the Home Championship.

19 May 1974: England are beaten 2–0 by Scotland at Hampden Park and finish second in the Home Championship.

29 May 1974: Tottenham Hotspur are beaten 4–2 on aggregate to Feyenoord in the UEFA Cup Final. Tottenham Hotspur supporters rioted after the second leg in Rotterdam, following Feyenoord's victory.

4 July 1974: Don Revie accepts The Football Association's offer to manage the England team, ending his 13-year reign as manager of Leeds United.

12 July 1974: Bill Shankly announced his retirement as manager after 15 years. He is to be succeeded by his 55-year-old assistant Bob Paisley.

30 July 1974: Brian Clough leaves Brighton & Hove Albion to become the new manager of Leeds United, but his assistant Peter Taylor remains at the Goldstone Ground and steps into the manager's seat there.

References